Rocky Mountain High is the sixth studio album released by American singer-songwriter John Denver in September 1972. It was his first US Top 10 album (no. 4), propelled by the single "Rocky Mountain High", and in addition reached no. 11 in the UK and no. 1 in Canada. The album's cover photograph was taken at Slaughterhouse Falls, Rio Grande Trail, Aspen, Colorado.

Track listing

Personnel
John Denver – 6-string guitars, twelve-string guitars, acoustic guitars, vocals, arrangements
Mike Taylor – guitar
Dick Kniss – double bass, arranger
Frank Owens – piano
Paul Prestopino – mandolin, dobro
Eric Weissberg – banjo, steel guitar
Gary Chester – drums, percussion
Bill Danoff, Martine Habib, Bruce Innes, Mike Kobluk, Taffy Nivert – backing vocals
Pupils of Whitby School, Greenwich, Connecticut – backing vocals on "For Baby (For Bobbie)"

References

John Denver albums
1972 albums
Albums produced by Milt Okun
RCA Records albums